Reutlingen is a quarter in the district 2 of Winterthur.

It was formerly a part of Oberwinterthur municipality, which was incorporated into Winterthur in 1922.

Reutlingen railway station is a stop of the S-Bahn Zürich on services S12 and S29. 

Winterthur